Tony's Theme may refer to:

 "Tony's Theme", an instrumental by Giorgio Moroder from the soundtrack of the 1983 film Scarface
 "Tony's Theme", a song by the Pixies from the album Surfer Rosa